Údlice is a municipality and village in Chomutov District in the Ústí nad Labem Region of the Czech Republic. It has about 1,300 inhabitants.

Administrative parts
The village of Přečaply is an administrative part of Údlice.

Geography
It lies in the Most Basin. The Chomutovka River flows through the municipality.

History

The first written mention of Údlice is from 1295. From 1446 until the end of the 16th century, the village was owned by the Lobkowicz family. Údlice was promoted to a town in 1539, but its lost the title during the Thirty Years' War, when it was plundered by the Swedish army. From 1605 until the establishment of a separate municipality, Údlice was part of the Červený Hrádek estate and shared its owners.

From 1938 to 1945, Údlice was annexed by Nazi Germany and administered as part of Reichsgau Sudetenland.

Sights
The Church of the Exaltation of the Holy Cross is originally a Romanesque church from the first half of the 13th century. It was rebuilt in 1400, and then into its current early Baroque form in the 17th century.

The Údlice Castle was built in the Baroque style in 1692–1695 on the site of a fortress from the 14th century. Today, the building is used by a secondary school.

The column with a statue of Saint Joseph in the middle of the square dates from 1716.

References

External links

Villages in Chomutov District